Châteaudun is a commune in the Eure-et-Loir department in northern France. It is a sub-prefecture of the department.  It was the site of the Battle of Châteaudun during the Franco-Prussian War.

Geography
It lies on the river Loir, a tributary of the Sarthe.

History
Châteaudun (Latin ), which dates from the Gallo-Roman period, was in the middle ages the capital of the County of Dunois.

The streets, which radiate from a central square, have a uniformity due to the reconstruction of the town after fires in 1723 and 1870.

Employment
The area is rich agricultural land, but a major local employer is the Châteaudun Air Base just to the east of the town, and much larger than the town itself.

Population

Main sights
The town has a château, founded in the 10th century, known for being the first on the road to Loire Valley from Paris.
The museum is diverse, the most popular exhibition being the big collection of stuffed birds. In addition, there are often temporary exhibitions, recent examples including the war of Asia, ancient Egypt and insects.

Churches

Medieval houses

Personalities
Châteaudun was the birthplace of:
 Pierre Guédron (1570–1620), composer
 Nicolas Chaperon (1612–1656) painter
 Edmond Modeste Lescarbault (1814), doctor and amateur astronomer
 Romain Feillu (1984) road racing cyclist
 Brice Feillu (1985) road racing cyclist

Twin towns - sister cities
Châteaudun is twinned with:
 Arklow, Ireland
 Kroměříž, Czech Republic
 Marchena, Spain
 Schweinfurt, Germany
 Trois-Rivières, Canada

Gallery

See also
Communes of the Eure-et-Loir department

References

External links

Official website (in French)
Tourist office website (in English and French)

Communes of Eure-et-Loir
Subprefectures in France
Carnutes
Orléanais